Delos Edward Goldsmith (September 3, 1828–July 3, 1921), was a prominent figure in the early development of Carmel-by-the-Sea, California. He was the town's first master builder and one of the earliest settlers. His niece was Abbie Jane Hunter, an early pioneer businesswoman, real estate developer, and visionary of Carmel-by-the-Sea. Delos Goldsmith built many of the early homes in Carmel. Some of his most notable projects were the construction of the first hotel (Pine Inn) and the Carmel Bathhouse, which quickly became a popular attractions for locals and tourists alike.

Early life 

Delos Goldsmith was born Delos Edward Goldsmith in Painesville, Ohio, on September 3, 1828. He was the son of architect Jonathan Gillett Goldsmith (1784-1847) of Milford, Connecticut, who is considered one of the leading architects of the Connecticut Western Reserve. His mother, Abigail Jones (1787-1887), was born of English parents in Massachusetts in 1787. His son, Delos E. Goldsmith, Jr. (1871-1900), a reporter, died early in life on August 2, 1900 in Painesville at the age of 29.

Career

In 1846, Goldsmith left Ohio at the age of nineteen for New Orleans. He then moved to San Francisco in 1850 when he was twenty-two and was a witness to the San Francisco Fire of 1851. He was a carpenter for two years in San Francisco and worked for the first Presidio of San Francisco. He moved back to Ohio and in 1858, at the age of 30, Goldsmith was listed as a carpenter in Painesville, Ohio.

He left for Marysville, and later went to Yuma, Arizona. He worked in the oil business until the outbreak of the American Civil War, when he was appointed citizen wagon master of the Twenty-ninth Ohio Volunteer  Infantry in the Union Army. Goldsmith was taken prisoner at Harper's Ferry by the Confederates and endured hardships until he escaped. He went south on a lumber expedition. 

Goldsmith married Anna Barbara Stenner (b. 1852) in Ohio on February 14, 1870, at age 42, and had three children, all born in Ohio. By 1872, at age 44, was selling real estate in Ohio. On January 27, 1872, he sold his aunt Francis J. Goldsmith  acres for $800. In 1879, he became an agent for Dr. Stockton, who was involved in oil. 

Goldsmith left Ohio and moved back to San Francisco in late 1886. His niece, Abbie Jane Hunter, was already living in San Francisco. She was a real estate agent for the Women's Investment Company in San Francisco, that would became Carmel's first real estate development group. Goldsmith completed his voter registration on October 16, 1888 in at 355 First Street in San Francisco.

Carmel City

In early 1888, Santiago J. Duckworth wanted to establish a Catholic retreat near the Carmel Mission, on homestead property, which then belonged to the US federal government. Duckworth would call it "Carmel City." Duckworth hired Abbie Hunter as a sales agent for Carmel City. In July 1888, Duckworth began selling lots. 

Goldsmith, Hunter, and her son Wesley R. Hunter (1876-1966), came to Carmel City in late 1888, where they started buying lots and building their first homes. Goldsmith became the first builder in Carmel.

Early Carmel City homes

In 1888, Goldsmith built a one-story vernacular side-gabled redwood residence for Duckworth, now known as the Santiago Duckworth House. The house is located on Carpenter Street SW of Second Avenue. Surveyor Davenport Bromfield built one of the oldest houses in Carmel City near this house. Bromfield also helped map out the streets of Carmel City. In 1888, Goldsmith and Hunter carried water from the Carmel River until a well was made.

In December 1889, Abbie Hunter bought seven lots in Carmel City from Duckworth. Goldsmith purchased five lots in March 1890. Over time, they each acquired more property.

Hotel Carmelo

In 1889, Duckworth set aside 5 lots on Broadway Avenue (now Junipero), between 6th Avenue and Ocean Avenue, for Carmel City's first two-story Craftsman-style 18-room Hotel Carmelo (now the present Pine Inn). Goldsmith built the hotel with the help of Hunter and her son, Wesley Hunter. The hotel had 8 bedrooms, a front and back parlor with an open fireplace, a dining room, and a front porch.

In 1890, trees were removed and an outline marked for the construction of Ocean Avenue heading up the hill. Visitors would take a horse-drawn carriage called the "Carmel Bus," from the Monterey train station to the town. They came to buy lots and stayed at the hotel. On July 4, 1891, a dance party was the first community event held at the hotel. In 1890, Duckworth printed a subdivision map, showing the hotel, cottages, and lots for sale.

Carmel bathhouse

In 1888-1889, Hunter and Goldsmith built the first community bathhouse at the end of Ocean Avenue at the Carmel beach, with the help of her son, Wesley Hunter. There was a boardwalk running from the main door to the beach. The bathhouse was built to attracts tourists and had a boardwalk running from the main door to the beach with a cupola and windows across the front to view the Carmel Bay coastline.

The bathhouse was also used for wedding receptions, club meetings, and church events. A water tank on the roof was heated by the sun, which could be used for showers. Dressing room, bathing suits, and towels rented for 25 cents. The bathhouse sold sandwiches, lemonade, popcorn, and candy.

The building lasted for forty years before being sold to the City of Carmel in 1921. The cost of upkeep and the potential for lawsuits led the city to sell it in 1929 to Mrs. W. C. Mann, who dismantled it and used the lumber for her own home. 

In 1890, Goldsmith did the design for the Farm Center building at the entrance of Robinson Canyon in Carmel Valley. It was the scene of get togethers for Carmel Valley residents. There was dancing with a fiddle, good food, and poker. By 1926, the center was called the Valley Social Club.

Carmel-by-the-Sea

In July 1892, Hunter's Women's Real Investment Company became the active developer and acquired 164 acres of the Carmel City tract through its investors. In 1892, Hunter sent out a bulk mailing post card promoting Carmel-by-the-Sea instead of a Catholic retreat. 

Between 1892 and 1894, Goldsmith worked with Hunter to build two identical historic Queen Anne-style cottages, designed by contractor Douglas Knox Fraiser, that still exist today. The first house was on the northeast corner of Guadalupe Street and 4th Avenue, on lots 16, 18, and 20 of block 41. It was the home for Hunter and her son, now known as the Abbie Jane Hunter House.  The house is a small, rustic cottage that is characteristic of the early cottages that were built in Carmel. William Askew became the owners of the home. The second home, on the northwest corner, became the Goldsmith's home. Goldsmith built a home for his wife's sister's daughter, Mrs. Augusta Robertson, where he lived while he constructed other homes for early residents. Robertson was the Vice-Principal of the Pacific Heights School and a stockholder and director of the Women’s Real Estate Investment Co. Today this is the home of the Carl Cherry Center for the Arts. They were the first houses in the area next to what was known as the Paradise Park.  

On August 16, 1891, Hunter and Goldsmith managed to sell 300 lots, mainly to teachers, professors, and writers. 

The real estate boom ended during the Panic of 1893 when the United States went into a five-year depression that began in 1893 and ended in 1897. Sales were stagnant and the Carmel project was losing money. On November 25, 1902, real estate developer James Franklin Devendorf and Frank Hubbard Powers established the Carmel Development Company, which laid the foundation to establish an artists and writers' colony that became Carmel-by-the-Sea in 1903. In the summer of 1902, Devendorf had Goldsmith place four portable houses at specific locations in town.

Goldsmith built a shed for his carpenter shop on the southwest corner of Ocean Avenue and San Carlos Street, behind the Carmel Development Company Building. It was one of Carmel City's first businesses. In 1904, Devendorf opened the first public school in the Goldsmith carpenter shop. The school had seven students and a teacher, Mary Westphal from San Jose.

In 1905, Goldsmith built a vernacular cabin on Monte Verde Street NW of 9th Avenue, now called the Sinclair Lewis House. Writer and playwright Sinclair Lewis and William Benet rented the home in 1909.

In September 1908, Goldsmith was given a surprise party on his 80th birthday. His nickname was announced at the party as "Goldie." In 1910, at age 81, Goldsmith, widowed, rented a house in Oakland, California with Hunter and two other boarders.

Death
Goldsmith died at the Carmel Peninsula hospital on July 3, 1921, at the age of 92. Funeral services were held on July 5, 1921. After his death, several Carmel lots were left to his surviving son, Wallace H. Goldsmith.

See also
 Timeline of Carmel-by-the-Sea, California
 Sawyer-Barrow House build by Jonathan Goldsmith

References

External links

 Carl Cherry Center for the Arts (Augusta Robertson cottage built by Goldsmith)

1828 births
1923 deaths
People from Carmel-by-the-Sea, California
People from Monterey, California
People from Ohio